The following is a list of the players who have scored the most points during their WNBA careers.

Scoring leaders

All statistics are up to date as of August 17, 2022.

Progressive list of scoring leaders
This is a progressive list of scoring leaders showing how the record increased through the years.
Statistics accurate as of April 9, 2022.

Notes

References

External links
WNBA Career Leaders and Records for Points at Basketball Reference
https://stats.wnba.com/alltime-leaders/ 

Lists of Women's National Basketball Association players
Women's National Basketball Association statistics